Los Rey is a Mexican telenovela produced by Elisa Salinas for TV Azteca in 2012, adapted from David Jacobs' Dallas. It stars Rossana Najera, Michel Brown and Leonardo Garcia.

Family tree 
This Family tree denotes the genetic and marital relationships of characters from the fictional television series Los Rey: 

|-
|style="text-align: left;"|Notes:

Main characters

The Reys

The Malvidos

Employees, friends and enemies

Special guest stars

Guest stars

References

Lists of drama television characters
Lists of Mexican television series characters
Fictional families
Fictional family trees